During the 2008–09 Ukrainian football season, FC Shakhtar Donetsk competed in the Ukrainian Premier League.

Season summary
Though Shakhtar failed to retain the league or cup, they made up for it by becoming the first Ukrainian team to win the UEFA Cup, defeating Werder Bremen in the final after extra time.

This season was the last played at RSC Olimpiyskiy. From the 2009–10 season onwards, Shakhtar played in the Donbass Arena.

On 28 May 2008, Shakhtar Donetsk announced the signing of Marcelo Moreno from Cruzeiro on a five-year contract. On the same day, Shakhtar also announced the signing of Oleksandr Chyzhov from Vorskla Poltava.

In January 2009, Shakhtar Donetsk sold Brandão to Marseille for a fee of €6,000,000.

On 9 February, Leonardo signed a new contract with Shakhtar Donetsk, until 28 June 2013, and joined Vasco da Gama on loan until 30 November 2009.

Squad

Transfers

In

 Moreno's move was announced on the above date, but was not finalised until the transfer window opened on 1 July 2008,

Out

Loans out

Competitions

Overall

Super Cup

Premier League

League table

Results summary

Results by round

Results

Ukrainian Cup

Final

UEFA Champions League

Qualifying rounds

Group stage

UEFA Cup

Knockout stage

Final

Squad statistics

Appearances and goals

|-
|colspan="16"|Players away on loan:
|-
|colspan="16"|Players who left Shakhtar Donetsk during the season:

|}

Goalscorers

Clean sheets

Disciplinary record

References

Notes

FC Shakhtar Donetsk seasons
FC Shakhtar Donetsk
UEFA Europa League-winning seasons